Clinton Casey Jones Jr. (July 19, 1918 – November 17, 1998) was an American Negro league catcher who played for the Memphis Red Sox from 1940 to 1955.

A native of Dublin, Mississippi, Jones broke into the Negro leagues in 1940 with the Memphis Red Sox, and played his entire career with the team. He was selected to play in the East–West All-Star Game in 1950 and 1951, and remained with the Red Sox through the 1955 season. Jones died in Memphis, Tennessee in 1998 at age 80.

References

External links
 and Seamheads

1918 births
1998 deaths
Memphis Red Sox players
Baseball catchers
People from Dublin, Mississippi
Baseball players from Mississippi
20th-century African-American sportspeople